Build UK is a representative organisation for the UK construction industry, formed by the September 2015 merger (announced the previous June) of the UK Contractors Group (UKCG) and the National Specialist Contractors Council (NSCC). By bringing together clients, main contractors, trade associations representing over 11,500 specialist contractors, and other organisations committed to industry collaboration, Build UK represents in excess of 40% of UK construction.

History
Build UK was launched on 1 September 2015, following the merger of the UKCG and the NSCC. Its initial action plan has five key areas: the image of construction, industry’s skills needs, effective pre-qualification, health and safety performance, and fair payment practices.

Following Carillion's January 2018 liquidation, Build UK set out an agenda to reform the construction industry's commercial model, potentially eliminating unfair contract terms, late payment and retentions.

In 2022, Build UK was awarded the 'Royal Charter Award for Excellence in Construction' by the Worshipful Company of Constructors for the leadership role it played during the COVID-19 pandemic in the United Kingdom.

UKCG
Established in January 2009, the UKCG succeeded the Major Contractors Group and the National Contractors Federation which had until that point represented the views of the leading UK contractors. The UKCG represented over 30 contractors operating in the UK. Between them (c. 2015), UKCG members accounted for £33 billion of construction turnover - a third of UK construction total output.

It was one of two organisations which represented the views of contractors on the Strategic Forum for Construction, along with the Construction Alliance. UKCG also worked closely with the Confederation of British Industry (CBI) Construction Council.

NSCC
The National Specialist Contractors' Council comprised 32 specialist trade associations representing companies involved in planning, design, construction, refurbishment and maintenance of the built environment. The NSCC represented these specialist trade organisations on the Strategic Forum for Construction, alongside the Specialist Engineering Contractors Group (superseded in 2021 by Actuate UK). It was a member of the Joint Contracts Tribunal.

Membership
Build UK has four categories of membership: Alliance, Clients, Contractors and Trade Associations.

References

External links
Build UK website

Construction trade groups based in the United Kingdom
Engineering organizations
Organisations based in the London Borough of Islington
Organizations established in 2015
2015 establishments in the United Kingdom